Picker Sisters is an American reality television show airing on the Lifetime network. The series premiered on August 2, 2011.

Premise
The series follows Tracy Hutson and Tanya McQueen, who travel around the United States in search of antiques and rare collectibles for their home decor store in Los Angeles.

Episodes

See also
American Pickers, a series with a similar premise on History.
Canadian Pickers, a series with a similar premise based in Canada
Aussie Pickers, a similar TV series featuring two pickers in Australia on the A&E Australia channel.

References

External links
Picker Sisters - official site on myLifetime.com
 

2010s American reality television series
2011 American television series debuts
2011 American television series endings
Lifetime (TV network) original programming
English-language television shows
Antiques television series